The Greenland ice sheet is a vast body of ice covering , roughly near 80% of the surface of Greenland. It is sometimes referred to as an ice cap, or under the term inland ice, or its Danish equivalent, indlandsis. An acronym, GIS, is frequently used in the scientific literature.

It is the second largest ice body in the world, after the Antarctic ice sheet. In addition to the large ice sheet, smaller ice caps (such as Maniitsoq and Flade Isblink) as well as glaciers, cover between  around the periphery. 

The Greenland ice sheet is adversely affected by climate change. It is more vulnerable to climate change than the Antarctic ice sheet because of its position in the Arctic, where it is subject to the regional amplification of warming. While only a small fraction of the ice sheet is expected to melt during the 21st century, it is believed that most or even all of the ice sheet is committed to melting under the present or likely near-future climate unless the recent warming is reversed, making it an example of a climate tipping point.

General
The presence of ice-rafted sediments in deep-sea cores recovered from northwest Greenland, in the Fram Strait, and south of Greenland indicated the more or less continuous presence of either an ice sheet or ice sheets covering significant parts of Greenland for the last 18 million years. From about 11 million years ago to 10 million years ago, the Greenland Ice Sheet was greatly reduced in size. The Greenland Ice Sheet formed in the middle Miocene by coalescence of ice caps and glaciers. There was an intensification of glaciation during the Late Pliocene. Ice sheet formed in connection to the uplift of the West Greenland and East Greenland uplands. The Western and Eastern Greenland mountains constitute passive continental margins that were uplifted in two phases, 10 and 5 million years ago, in the Miocene epoch. Computer modelling shows that the uplift would have enabled glaciation by producing increased orographic precipitation and cooling the surface temperatures. The oldest known ice in the current ice sheet is as much as 1,000,000 years old. The ice cores also record human impact, such as lead from the Roman Empire.

The weight of the ice has depressed the central area of Greenland; the bedrock surface is near sea level over most of the interior of Greenland, but mountains occur around the periphery, confining the sheet along its margins. If the ice suddenly disappeared, Greenland would most probably appear as an archipelago, at least until isostasy lifted the land surface above sea level once again. The ice surface reaches its greatest altitude on two north–south elongated domes, or ridges. The crests of both domes are displaced east of the centre line of Greenland. The unconfined ice sheet does not reach the sea along a broad front anywhere in Greenland, so that no large ice shelves occur. The ice margin just reaches the sea, however, in a region of irregular topography in the area of Melville Bay southeast of Thule, as well as in Jokel Bay. Large outlet glaciers, which are restricted tongues of the ice sheet, move through bordering valleys around the periphery of Greenland to calve off into the ocean, producing the numerous icebergs that sometimes occur in North Atlantic shipping lanes.

On the ice sheet, temperatures are generally substantially lower than elsewhere in Greenland, due to the local effects of ice-albedo feedback. The record went unnoticed for more than 28 years and was finally recognized in 2020.

The ice sheet as a record of past climates

The ice sheet, consisting of layers of compressed snow from more than 100,000 years, contains in its ice today's most valuable record of past climates. Scientists have, using those ice cores, obtained information on (proxies for) temperature, ocean volume, precipitation, chemistry and gas composition of the lower atmosphere, volcanic eruptions, solar variability, sea-surface productivity, desert extent and forest fires. Subglacial sediment from ~ beneath the ice stored since 1966 indicates that Greenland was completely ice-free and vegetated at least once within the last million years. This was not expected and may show Greenland to be more fragile and sensitive to climate change than previously thought.

Recent climate change

General considerations on rate of change

In the earlier decades, an area in the North Atlantic including southern Greenland was one of the only areas in the World showing cooling rather than warming, and Greenland had shown more complex temperature trends than the other areas of the world. A 2006 paper on Greenland's temperature record showed that the warmest year on record was 1941 while the warmest decades were the 1930s and 1940s.  The data used was from stations on the south and west coasts, most of which did not operate continuously the entire study period. However, later and more complete data sets have established strong warming in the period 1979–2005 (consistent with the concurrently observed Arctic sea ice decline and its ice-albedo feedback) As the Greenland Ice Sheet had experienced unprecedented melting since the detailed records began, and is likely to contribute substantially to sea level rise as well as to possible changes in ocean circulation in the future. 

Several factors determine the net rate of growth or decline. These are:
 Accumulation and melting rates of snow in the central parts
 Melting of surface snow and ice which then flows into moulins, falls and flows to bedrock, lubricates the base of glaciers, and affects the speed of glacial motion. This flow is implicated in accelerating the speed of glaciers and thus the rate of glacial calving.
 Melting of ice along the sheet's margins (runoff) and basal hydrology,
 Iceberg calving into the sea from outlet glaciers also along the sheet's edges

The last time that the combination of these factors had resulted in a net mass gain was in 1996. As of 2022, Greenland ice sheet had been losing ice for 26 years in a row.

The snow line is the dividing line between the area, above the snow line, where snow continues to accumulate during the summer, and the area below the snow line which experiences summer melting. The melt zone, where summer warmth turns snow and ice into slush and melt ponds of meltwater, has been expanding at an accelerating rate in recent years. When the meltwater seeps down through cracks in the sheet, it accelerates the melting and, in some areas, allows the ice to slide more easily over the bedrock below, speeding its movement to the sea. Besides contributing to global sea level rise, the process adds freshwater to the ocean, which may disturb ocean circulation and thus regional climate. 

An examination of 32 outlet glaciers in southeast Greenland indicates that the acceleration is significant only for marine-terminating outlet glaciers—glaciers that calve into the ocean. A 2008 study noted that the thinning of the ice sheet is most pronounced for marine-terminating outlet glaciers. As a result of the above, all concluded that the only plausible sequence of events is that increased thinning of the terminus regions, of marine-terminating outlet glaciers, ungrounded the glacier tongues and subsequently allowed acceleration, retreat and further thinning.

Two mechanisms have been utilized to explain the change in velocity of the Greenland Ice Sheets outlet glaciers.  The first is the enhanced meltwater effect, which relies on additional surface melting, funneled through moulins reaching the glacier base and reducing the friction through a higher basal water pressure. (Not all meltwater is retained in the ice sheet and some moulins drain into the ocean, with varying rapidity.)  This idea was observed to be the cause of a brief seasonal acceleration of up to 20% on Sermeq Kujalleq in 1998 and 1999 at Swiss Camp. The acceleration lasted between two and three months and was less than 10% in 1996 and 1997 for example. They offered a conclusion that the "coupling between surface melting and ice-sheet flow provides a mechanism for rapid, large-scale, dynamic responses of ice sheets to climate warming". Examination of recent rapid supra-glacial lake drainage documented short term velocity changes due to such events, but they had little significance to the annual flow of the large outlet glaciers.

The second mechanism is a force imbalance at the calving front due to thinning causing a substantial non-linear response. In this case an imbalance of forces at the calving front propagates up-glacier. Thinning causes the glacier to be more buoyant, reducing frictional back forces, as the glacier becomes more afloat at the calving front. The reduced friction due to greater buoyancy allows for an increase in velocity. This is akin to letting off the emergency brake a bit. The reduced resistive force at the calving front is then propagated up-glacier via longitudinal extension because of the backforce reduction.If the enhanced meltwater effect is the key, then since meltwater is a seasonal input, velocity would have a seasonal signal and all glaciers would experience this effect. If the force imbalance effect is the key, then the velocity will propagate up-glacier, there will be no seasonal cycle, and the acceleration will be focused on calving glaciers.

Warmer temperatures in the region have brought increased precipitation to Greenland, and part of the lost mass has been offset by increased snowfall. However, there are only a small number of weather stations on the island, and though satellite data can examine the entire island, it has only been available since the early 1990s, making the study of trends difficult. It has been observed that there is more precipitation where it is warmer, up to 1.5 meters per year on the southeast flank, and less precipitation or none on the 25–80 percent (depending on the time of year) of the island that is cooler. On the other hand, global warming is increasing growth of algae on the ice sheet. This darkens the ice causing it to absorb more sunlight and potentially increasing the rate of melting.

Observations

2000s

The IPCC Third Assessment Report was published in 2001, and it estimated the accumulation to 520 ± 26 Gigatonnes of ice per year, runoff and bottom melting to 297±32 Gt/yr and 32±3 Gt/yr, respectively, and iceberg production to 235±33 Gt/yr. On balance, the IPCC estimates −44 ± 53 Gt/yr, which means that the ice sheet may currently be melting. Data from 1996 to 2005 shows that the ice sheet is thinning even faster than supposed by IPCC. It was estimated that in the year 2007 Greenland ice sheet melting was higher than ever, . Also snowfall was unusually low, which led to unprecedented negative  Surface Mass Balance. If iceberg calving has happened as an average, Greenland lost 294 Gt of its mass during 2007 (one km3 of ice weighs about 0.9 Gt).

By 2002, the area below the snow line was found to have increased by 16% since the beginning of detailed measurements in 1979. The area of melting in 2002 broke all previous records. The number of glacial earthquakes at the Helheim Glacier and the northwest Greenland glaciers increased substantially between 1993 and 2005. These measurements came from the US space agency's GRACE (Gravity Recovery and Climate Experiment) satellite, launched in 2002, as reported by BBC. Using data from two ground-observing satellites, ICESAT and ASTER, a study published in Geophysical Research Letters (September 2008) shows that nearly 75 percent of the loss of Greenland's ice can be traced back to small coastal glaciers.

Notable calving events had also been recorded in 2000s. For instance, Helheim Glacier in East Greenland had a stable terminus from the 1970s–2000. Kangerdlugssuaq Glacier, East Greenland had a stable terminus history from 1960 to 2002. The glacier velocity was /day in the 1990s. On Helheim the thinning and velocity propagated up-glacier from the calving front. In each case the major outlet glaciers accelerated by at least 50%, much larger than the impact noted due to summer meltwater increase. On each glacier the acceleration was not restricted to the summer, persisting through the winter when surface meltwater is absent.

Between 2000 and 2001, Northern Greenland's Petermann glacier lost  of floating ice, and a  piece of Petermann suddenly broke away in 2008. Sermeq Kujalleq broke up by 2005, losing  in a dramatic event credited by some NASA scientists with raising worldwide awareness of glacial response to global climate change.

In 2007, the IPCC Fourth Assessment Report noted that most mass balance estimates indicate accelerating mass loss from Greenland during the 1990s up to 2005. Assessment of the data and techniques suggests a mass balance for the Greenland Ice Sheet ranging between growth of 25 Gt/yr and loss of 60 Gt/yr for 1961 to 2003, loss of 50 to 100 Gt/yr for 1993 to 2003 and loss at even higher rates between 2003 and 2005.

Since 2010

A sheet of ice measuring  broke off from the Petermann Glacier in northern Greenland in August 2010. Researchers from the Canadian Ice Service located the calving from NASA satellite images taken on August 5. The images showed that Petermann lost about one-quarter of its 70 km-long (43 mile) floating ice shelf.

In July 2012, melt zone extended to 97 percent of the ice sheet's cover. Ice cores show that events such as this occur approximately every 150 years on average. The last time a melt this large happened was in 1889. This particular melt may be part of cyclical behavior; however, Lora Koenig, a Goddard glaciologist suggested that "...if we continue to observe melting events like this in upcoming years, it will be worrisome." This was the first directly observed example of what came to be known as a "massive melting event": the ice core research most melting events before the 21st century were localized rather than widespread across the bulk of the Greenland ice sheet. At the end of 2012, the analysis of gravity data from GRACE satellites indicated that the Greenland ice sheet lost approximately 2900 Gt (0.1% of its total mass) between March 2002 and September 2012.

A 2013 Nature study identified a contribution from the optically thin liquid-bearing clouds to the extent of ice melt during July 2012. In 2016, another paper suggested that clouds in general enhance Greenland ice sheet's meltwater runoff by more than 30% due to decreased meltwater refreezing in the firn layer at night. In 2018, it was also found that the observed Greenland surface melt was affected by a darkening albedo (and thus increased absorption of thermal radiation), as the regions covered in dust, soot, and living microbes and algae grew by 12% between 2000 and 2012. 

In 2019, another mass melting event (covering more than 300,000 square miles) occurred in both June and July, due to cloud cover and high temperatures. In August 2020, scientists reported that the Greenland ice sheet lost a record amount of 532 billion metric tons of ice during 2019, surpassing the old record of 464 billion metric tons in 2012 and returning to high melt rates, and provide explanations for the reduced ice loss in 2017 and 2018.

A study published in 2020 estimated, by combining 26 individual estimates of mass balance derived by tracking changes in Greenland's ice sheet volume, speed and gravity as part of the Ice Sheet Mass Balance Inter-comparison Exercise, that the Greenland Ice Sheet had lost a total of 3,902 gigatons (Gt) of ice between 1992 and 2018 (approximately 0.13% of its mass). The rate of ice loss has increased over time from 26 ± 27 Gt/year between 1992 and 1997 to 244 ± 28 Gt/year between 2012 and 2017 with a peak mass loss rate of 275 ± 28 Gt/year during the period 2007 and 2012.

In July 2021, a new surge of widespread melting began, covering 340,000 square miles of the ice sheet, and melting more than 8 billion tons of ice per day for several days. In August 2021, as high temperatures continued over Greenland, with the melt extent at 337,000 square miles, rain fell for 13 hours at Greenland's Summit Station (at 10,551 feet elevation.) Researchers had no rain gauges to measure the rainfall, because temperatures at the summit have risen above freezing only three times since 1989 and it had never rained there before.

Future ice loss 

Due to the enormous thickness of the central Greenland ice sheet, even the most extensive melting event can only affect a small fraction of it before the start of the freezing season.

For comparison, Greenland Ice Sheet is estimated to have contributed about 0.68 mm per year between 2012 and 2017, which is already a significant acceleration from the 1990s, when it contributed  0.07 mm per year between 1992 and 1997.  This net contribution for the 2012–2016 period was also equivalent to 37% of sea level rise from land ice sources (excluding thermal expansion). Moreover, this contribution is disproportionately shaped by the most remote and vulnerable parts of the ice sheet such as its largest outlet glaciers, Jakobshavn Isbræ and Kangerlussuaq Glacier. Northeast Greenland Ice Stream is another relatively small area with a disproportionate impact on sea level rise: it was estimated in 2022 to contribute 1.3-1.5cm by 2100 all on its own under RCP 4.5 and RCP 8.5, respectively. 

However, while the ice sheet's massive size makes it insensitive to temperature changes in the short run, it also commits it to enormous changes down the line. The most vulnerable parts of the ice sheet which currently have a disproportionate contribution to its melt are already known to be beyond "a point of no return", with some estimates suggesting that they passed it around 1997, and will be committed to disappearance even if the temperature stops rising. A 2022 paper found that the 2000–2019 climate would already result in the loss of ~3.3% volume of the entire ice sheet in the future, committing it to an eventual  of SLR, independent of any future temperature change. They have additionally estimated that if the then-record melting seen on the ice sheet in 2012 were to become its new normal, then the ice sheet would be committed to around  SLR.

Many scientists who study the ice losses in Greenland consider that an increase in temperature of two or three degrees Celsius would result in a complete melting of Greenland's ice.If the entire  of ice were to melt, global sea levels would rise . Recently, fears have grown that continued climate change will make the Greenland Ice Sheet cross a threshold where long-term melting of the ice sheet is inevitable. Climate models project that local warming in Greenland will be  to  during this century. Such a rise would inundate almost every major coastal city in the world. How fast the melt would eventually occur is a matter of discussion. According to the IPCC 2001 report, such warming would, if kept from rising further after the 21st Century, result in 1 to 5 meter sea level rise over the next millennium due to Greenland ice sheet melting. Some scientists have cautioned that these rates of melting are overly optimistic as they assume a linear, rather than erratic, progression. James E. Hansen has argued that multiple positive feedbacks could lead to nonlinear ice sheet disintegration much faster than claimed by the IPCC. According to a 2007 paper, "we find no evidence of millennial lags between forcing and ice sheet response in paleoclimate data. An ice sheet response time of centuries seems probable, and we cannot rule out large changes on decadal time-scales once wide-scale surface melt is underway."

In a 2013 study published in Nature, 133 researchers analyzed a Greenland ice core from the Eemian interglacial. They concluded that during this geological period, roughly 130,000–115,000 years ago, the GIS (Greenland Ice Sheet) was  warmer than today. This resulted in a thickness decrease of the northwest Greenland ice sheet by 400 ± 250 metres, reaching surface elevations 122,000 years ago of 130 ± 300 metres lower than at present. A 2021 analysis of sub-glacial sediment at the bottom of a 1.4 km Greenland ice core finds that the Greenland ice sheet melted away at least once during the last million years, indicating that its tipping point is below the  maximum warming relative to the preindustrial conditions over that period. 

At the same time, it noted that the fastest plausible timeline for a disintegration is 1000 years after the tipping threshold is crossed, while it is far more likely to take place over 10,000 years; the longest possible estimate is 15,000 years.

Meltwater run-off  

Meltwater around Greenland may transport nutrients and organic carbon to the ocean. Measurements of the amount of iron in meltwater from the Greenland ice sheet show that extensive melting of the ice sheet might add an amount of this micronutrient to the Atlantic Ocean equivalent to that added by airborne dust. However much of the particles and iron derived from glaciers around Greenland may be trapped within the extensive fjords that surround the island and, unlike the HNLC Southern ocean where iron is an extensive limiting micronutrient, biological production in the North Atlantic is subject only to very spatially and temporally limited periods of iron limitation. Nonetheless, high productivity is observed in the immediate vicinity of major marine terminating glaciers around Greenland and this is attributed to meltwater inputs driving the upwelling of seawater rich in macronutrients.

The United States built a secret nuclear powered base, called Camp Century, in the Greenland ice sheet. In 2016, a group of scientists evaluated the environmental impact and estimated that due to changing weather patterns over the next few decades, melt water could release the nuclear waste, 20,000 liters of chemical waste and 24 million liters of untreated sewage into the environment. However, so far neither US or Denmark has taken responsibility for the clean-up.

A study published in 2016, by researchers from the University of South Florida, Canada and the Netherlands, used GRACE satellite data to estimate freshwater flux from Greenland. They concluded that freshwater runoff is accelerating, and could eventually cause a disruption of AMOC in the future, which would affect Europe and North America.

A 2018 international study found that the fertilizing effect of meltwater around Greenland is highly sensitive to the glacier grounding line depth it is released at. Retreat of Greenland's large marine-terminating glaciers inland will diminish the fertilizing effect of meltwater- even with further large increases in freshwater discharge volume.

A 2015 study by climate scientists Michael Mann of Penn State and Stefan Rahmstorf from the Potsdam Institute for Climate Impact Research suggests that the observed cold blob in the North Atlantic during years of temperature records is a sign that the Atlantic Ocean's Meridional overturning circulation (AMOC) may be weakening. They published their findings, and concluded that the AMOC circulation shows exceptional slowdown in the last century, and that Greenland melt is a possible contributor.

See also 
GLIMPSE Project
List of glaciers in Greenland
Polar ice packs
Retreat of glaciers since 1850
Isostatic depression - induced by Greenland ice sheet

Notes

References

External links 

Real Climate the Greenland Ice
Geological Survey of Denmark and Greenland (GEUS)  GEUS has much scientific material on Greenland.
Emporia State University – James S. Aber Lecture 2: Modern Glaciers and Ice Sheets.
Arctic Climate Impact Assessment
GRACE ice mass measurement:  "Recent Land Ice Mass Flux from SpaceborneGravimetry"
Greenland ice cap melting faster than ever, Bristol University
Greenland Ice Mass Loss: Jan. 2004 – June 2014 (NASA animation)
 Greenland Ice Cap, 1942-1944 Report at Dartmouth College Library
 Greenland Ice Cap literary Survey/Bibliography 1953 at Dartmouth College Library

Bodies of ice of Greenland
Climate of Greenland
Ice sheets
Articles containing video clips